Seyf ol Din (also Romanized as Seyf ol Dīn) is a village in Gavkan Rural District, in the Central District of Rigan County, Kerman Province, Iran. At the 2006 census, its population was 821, in 125 families.

References 

Populated places in Rigan County